Zhang Yong (born March 1956) is a Chinese agronomist who is a professor and doctoral supervisor at Northwest A&F University. His scientific pursuits integrated the fields of animal cloning, transgenic technique and animal embryo engineering.

Biography
Zhang was born in Horinger County, Inner Mongolia, in March 1956. He received his bachelor's degree from Inner Mongolia Institute of Agriculture& Animal Husbandry (now Inner Mongolia Agricultural University) in 1982, and his master's degree and doctor's degree from Northwest Agricultural University (now Northwest A&F University) in 1984 and 1990, respectively. After graduation, he was offered a faculty position at the Department of Veterinary Medicine of the university.

Honours and awards
 November 22, 2019 Member of the Chinese Academy of Engineering (CAE)

References

1956 births
Living people
People from Horinger County
Engineers from Inner Mongolia
Inner Mongolia Agricultural University alumni
Northwest A&F University alumni
Academic staff of the Northwest A&F University
Members of the Chinese Academy of Engineering